Voloshchuk is a surname. Notable people with the surname include:

 Yuri Voloshchuk (born 1941), Ukrainian radio astronomer after whom main-belt asteroid 13009 Voloshchuk is named
 Semyon Voloshchuk, in the Cabinet of Boris Yeltsin and Yegor Gaidar
 Mykhailo Voloshchuk, a members of the parliament of Ukraine, 1990–1994
 Konstantin Voloshchuk, a Hero of the Soviet Union